Kansas's 11th Senate district is one of 40 districts in the Kansas Senate. It has been represented by Republican John Skubal since 2017; Skubal was defeated in the 2020 primary election by State Representative Kellie Warren.

Geography
District 11 covers much of Leawood and parts of eastern Overland Park in the Johnson County suburbs of Kansas City.

The district is located entirely within Kansas's 3rd congressional district, and overlaps with the 8th, 19th, 20th, 27th, 28th, and 48th districts of the Kansas House of Representatives. It borders the state of Missouri.

Recent election results

2020

2016

2012

Federal and statewide results in District 11

References

11
Johnson County, Kansas